Chiron cylindrus, is a species of true dung beetle widely distributed from Myanmar to Sri Lanka and towards tropical Africa.

Description
Average length is about 9 to 11 mm. Body elongate and cylindrical, with shiny surface. Dorsum brown to black in color. Head coarse and fine. Clypeus small and broad, with a small transverse median carina. Pronotum fine and sparsely punctate. Scutellum narrow, elongate with a blunt apex. Elytra finely punctate and striated.

Adults are frequently observed in the 1st and 2nd weeks of September where both the larvae as well as adults feed on dung.

References 

Scarabaeinae
Insects of Sri Lanka
Insects of India
Insects described in 1798